Terms such as storm(s) of war and the storm(s) of war have been used in multiple contexts throughout history:
IL-2 Sturmovik: Cliffs of Dover, a video game initially known as Storm of War: Battle of Britain
The Storm of War, a 2009 non-fiction book chronicling WWII
Storms of War, a 2012 album by Swedish heavy metal band Katana

See also
"Hail, Columbia", a popular song prominently using the line
"We shall fight on the beaches", an iconic speech prominently using the line